Jean Ado Baltus (20 May 1918 – 17 September 1990) was a Belgian architect and painter. His father was painter Georges Baltus.

References

1918 births
1990 deaths
20th-century Belgian architects
People from Ixelles